Hashem Khastar (born June 2, 1953) is a former teacher at the Agriculture Technical High School in Mashhad in northeastern Iran, and an agricultural engineer and the Head of the Mashhad Teachers Union.

Background

He has been detained several times for defending teachers' rights and participating in rally protests of teachers and recently having served a term from 2009 to 2011 in Mashhad's notorious prison, Vakilabad.

He directly targeted the Leader of the Islamic Republic in a letter saying that “the root of the corruption and all the problems, was Ali Khamenei”, and that he had to be held accountable.

Khastar was previously detained in Vakilabad Prison in Mashhad and despite being threatened by agents of the Ministry of Intelligence on several occasion he had refused to cease his activities.

On October 23, 2018 he disappeared in the city of Mashhad and is being detained by the Islamic Republic's Intelligence Ministry at a psychiatric hospital, his wife disclosed in an interview. 
Hashem Khastar was released a few hours after being taken into custody on Monday, November 5, 2018.

References

Living people
1953 births
People from Mashhad
Prisoners and detainees of Iran
Iranian activists
Iranian democracy activists
Iranian schoolteachers